Integrated Centre of Trade Unions, Nepal (ICTU) (Nepali: एकीकृत ट्रेड यूनियन महासंघ) is a confederation of 20 national trade union federations. It is politically tied to the Communist Party of Nepal (Unified Socialist).

Trade Unions have existed in Nepal since the All Nepal Trade Union Congress was formed in 1946, but only really came into power after the collapse of the Rana dynasty in 1951 and the movement towards democracy. ICTU itself was established in 2021 when a split occurred in the Communist Party of Nepal (Unified Marxist–Leninist).

Sector union 

 Unified Nepal's Government Employees' Organisation (एकीकृत सरकारी कर्मचारी संगठन नेपाल)
 All Nepal Peasants Association (अखिल नेपाल किसान महासंघ)
 Nepal National Teachers Association (नेपाल राष्ट्रिय शिक्षक संघ)

See also 

 Nepal Trade Union Congress 
 General Federation of Nepalese Trade Unions

References 

National trade union centers of Nepal
Communist Party of Nepal (Unified Socialist)
Trade unions established in 2021
2021 establishments in Nepal